Mwinilunga is a town in the North-Western Province of Zambia. It is the headquarters of Mwinilunga District, one of the province's eleven districts.

Location
The town lies on the west bank of the West Lunga River, along the Chingola–Solwezi–Mwinilunga Road (T5 Road of Zambia), which continues north-westwards to Caianda, in Angola. Another tarmacked state road (D286 Road of Zambia), leads south to Kabompo, the capital of Kabompo District.

Mwinilunga sits in the extreme north-western corner of the country, close to the international borders with Angola and the Democratic Republic of the Congo. The geographical coordinates of Mwinilunga, Zambia are:11°43'02.0"S, 24°25'44.0"E
(Latitude:-11.717222; Longitude:24.428889).

Overview 
Due to its proximity with Angola and DR Congo, Mwinilunga would have benefited from trade with the two neighboring countries. Poor roads, human conflict and lack of collective political will in the three countries, have so far prevented any meaningful trade policy from developing.

Population
The town had a population estimated at 14,500 in 2006. The Chilunda-speaking Kanongesha-Lunda people are the largest ethnic group, and are related to the Chibemba-speaking Kazembe-Lunda of Luapula Province. In 1990, the census carried out that year, put the town's population at 6,342 people. In 2000, the population was 10,745 inhabitants. During the 2010 national census, the population of Mwinilunga was enumerated at 15,704 people. The table below illustrates the same data in tabular format.

Climate 

This is one of the wettest places in Zambia with annual rainfall of about  falling in the rainy season from October to May.

Education
Mwinilunga Secondary School is the largest school to date in town. Government and community schools are scattered in the neighborhoods surrounding the metropolitan area, and provide education for children from nursery through high school. Mwinilunga is also home to The Sakeji School, a primary boarding school.

Economy
Forest Fruits Limited has been operating in Mwinilunga since 1998, successfully working with over 7,000 beekeepers in the region to export organic honey to the European market. The company also employs about 100 staff.

Kasenseli Gold Mine 
See: Mining in Zambia Kasenseli Gold Mine

In early August 2019 gold deposits were discovered and confirmed by experts from the Ministry of Mines and Mineral Development. The Government, through its subsidiary, ZCCM Investments Holdings (ZCCM-IH), intends to set up a gold mine in Chief Chibwika's area where the gold deposits have been discovered.

Kalene Hills Fruit Factory 
Commissioned: July 2022

Construction Cost: ZMW 130.0 million (US$ 7.8 million)

Ownership: Kalene Hills Fruit Company, a 100% Zambian-owned business  set up with support from the Industrial Development Corporation.

Operations: Processing fruits as well as other products such as beans, groundnuts and tomatoes supplied by over 1,500 small-scale farmers.

Direct Jobs: 150

In-Direct Jobs: 780

Transport

In 2006 plans were formulated to extend the proposed railway to Solwezi to the town and even on to the Benguela Railway in Angola to avoid reliance on the line in the DR Congo, but these plans have not been confirmed and the Benguela Railway has not yet been re-opened. However, the Angolan transport ministry plans to build a line branching off the Benguela Railway at Luacano and entering Zambia from Macango, Angola. The town is also home to Mwinilunga Airport.

 Tourism 

Mwinilunga lies southeast of the Nchila Wildlife Reserve rainforest, known for its sable antelope and other large mammals, Luakela Forest Reserve and the Chitunta Plain, known for its birdlife and as the source of the Zambezi River. The annual Chisemwa cha Lunda'' ceremony held by Senior Chief Kanongesha of the Lunda draws crowds to the district every September. Nyaunda Ceremony celebrated by Lundas of Senior Sailunga East of Mwinilunga.

References

External links
 Zambia: 3 Illegal Gold Miners Die in Mwinilunga As at 12 August 2019.

Mwinilunga District
Populated places in North-Western Province, Zambia